The African-American Film Critics Association (AAFCA) is the world's largest group of Black film critics that gives various annual awards for excellence in film and television. It was founded in 2003 in New York City.

History
The association was founded in 2003 by Gil L. Robertson IV and Shawn Edwards. They met in New York City after a press junket, and were both concerned with the lack of themed stories in the film industry from the African Diaspora. In several weeks, the two of them were supported by other colleagues in their plan to create an association of black film critics. They drafted the initial outline for the association while in Los Angeles. In December 2003, the African-American Film Critics Association officially announced the start of its organization, and released its first "Top Ten List."

In 2019, the association began giving awards to television shows in the spring. AAFCA also joined with the Asian American Journalists Association (AAJA),  GALECA: The Society of LGBTQ Entertainment Critics, the Latino Entertainment Journalists Association (LEJA), and the Online Association of Female Film Critics (OAFFC) to form the Critics Groups for Equality in Media to "help foster greater diversity in entertainment journalism" through various initiatives including a "watchdog" grading system.

Mission
The association actively reviews cinema overall, but highlights films about the African-American experience. The AAFCA produces awareness for films with widespread appeal to the black community while stressing the importance of films produced, written, directed and starring people of African descent. Members also involve themselves in advocacy work for students interested in film journalism and criticism.

The organization gives out awards for a variety of categories. Best Feature Film, Best Documentary, Best Actress, Best Actor, Best Supporting Actress, Best Supporting Actor, Best Director, Best Foreign Film, Best Screenplay, and Best Original Song. The AAFC also gives out an award for Special Achievement which has been received by Jamie Foxx, John Singleton, as well as Spike Lee.

Membership
Members of AAFCA are a geographically diverse range of journalists who cover every genre of film and represent numerous mediums such as television, radio broadcast, online, and print. Membership into the AAFCA is by invitation only, with approval of the Board of Governors.
 
There are three classifications for membership in the AAFCA; active member, associate member, and student. An active member is one who writes regular film criticism for a medium with a minimum of 24 to qualify and must be based in the United States. Once accepted the active member must have a constant presence in the critique of commercial American films. An associate member is one who writes regular film coverage for a medium and must express their affiliation with an established media body by providing a written letter on company letterhead. Finally, a minimum of twelve samples of film critique is needed for consideration. A student member is one who is attending an accredited college or university and is majoring in journalism or broadcast media.

Special programs
Panel discussions led by an AAFCA member are also offered by the association. One such panel is about the concept of diversity in modern films. It accentuates an understanding that each individual is special and different. The differences may run along lines of race, ethnicity, gender socio-economic status, physical abilities, sexual orientation, age, physical abilities, religious beliefs, political beliefs, or other ideologies. The panel explores the role cinema plays in understanding one another and to go beyond a simplistic message of tolerance to one of celebrating and acceptance of the plentiful dimensions of diversity in every person.

Another panel entitled "What Every Filmmaker Needs to Know about Film Critics", explores the important areas filmmakers must know when making a film. Film critics influence the success and failure of a film through their reviews so this panel attempts to help new filmmakers. It discusses the significance of plot lines and story narrative in films, the deliberations that must go into casting a film, and the crucial technical and imaginative elements filmmakers should reflect on before presenting their work to the public.

The final program offered by the AAFCA is the Junior Critic Program. Working with the historically black colleges and universities, the AAFCA selects four journalism students who demonstrate a talent and/or interest in film to cover a film promotional event as a working journalist. The selection process for the students is based on academic or department recommendations and an interview with an AAFCA member. The representative chaperones the selected student for the media event and then provides assistance with the final report.

In 2017, the AAFCA produced a series of screenings and panels honoring the late Prince at libraries and museums in Kansas City, Denver, Atlanta and Broward County, Florida.

Scandal 

In 2009, the big winner at the African American Film Critics Association was Precious: Based on the Novel "Push" by Sapphire. The adaption won best picture, best director, best screenplay, and best supporting actress. The film's star, Gabourey Sidibe, did not win best actress, in favor of Nicole Beharie from American Violet.

After the awards, gossip blogger Roger Friedman of The Hollywood Reporter reported the tally had been manipulated by the group's president, Gil Robertson IV. Friedman posed that Robertson was to receive a bribe in the form of a donation from the producers affiliated with American Violet.

The issue sparked infighting among the group leading to a splintering. Three founding members of the AAFCA—Shawn Edwards of FOX-TV, Wilson Morales of Blackfilm.com/AOL Blackvoices, and Mike Sargent WBAI-FM/Tor.com—withdrew and created a new group, the Black Film Critics Circle. The new group includes five other former AAFCA members and officially debuted in February 2010. In the founding announcement, the Black Film Critics Circle made known that they were going to "maintain the integrity of a true critics organization". 

In a statement released December 28, 2009, and signed by 15 of the group's members, Robertson denied all accusations related to ballot tampering, and wished any group wanting to further black film appreciation the best. The only evidence to the controversy on the AAFCA website is the inclusion that "Effective January 1, 2010, final tabulations for all AAFCA Award categories will be handled by Beverly Hills accountant W. Steven Temple"

Executive team
Gil L. Robertson IV – President
 Daryle Lockhart – Vice President, East Coast
 Kathy Williamson – Vice President, West Coast
 Etienne Maurice - Creative Executive

Advisory board
Russell Williams – Oscar winner; Professor, American University; Co-founder
 Darrell Miller – Fox, Rothschilds, LLP
Latanya Richardson – Actress, Philanthropist
 W. Stephen Temple – President of Business Affairs Mgmt., Inc
Ava Duvernay – Filmmaker; President of DVA Media & Marketing
 Vicangelo Bullock – President of NAACP – Beverly Hills/Hollywood
 Asante Bradford – Georgia Film, Music, & Digital Entertainment

Best Picture

Awards
 African-American Film Critics Association Awards 2003
 African-American Film Critics Association Awards 2004
 African-American Film Critics Association Awards 2005
 African-American Film Critics Association Awards 2006
 African-American Film Critics Association Awards 2007
 African-American Film Critics Association Awards 2008
 African-American Film Critics Association Awards 2009
 African-American Film Critics Association Awards 2010
 African-American Film Critics Association Awards 2011
 African-American Film Critics Association Awards 2012
 African-American Film Critics Association Awards 2013
 African-American Film Critics Association Awards 2014
 African-American Film Critics Association Awards 2015
 African-American Film Critics Association Awards 2016
 African-American Film Critics Association Awards 2017

References

Works cited
Barboza, Craigh. John Singleton: Interviews. Jackson: U.P. of Mississippi, 2009.

External links
 

American film critics associations
African-American cinema
 
Journalism-related professional associations
Organizations established in 2003